Atelopus chrysocorallus is a species of toad in the family Bufonidae endemic to Venezuela. Its natural habitats are subtropical or tropical moist montane forests, rivers, and intermittent rivers. It is threatened by habitat loss.

References

chrysocorallus
Amphibians described in 1996
Amphibians of Venezuela
Endemic fauna of Venezuela
Taxonomy articles created by Polbot